Songs of the Bards of the Tyne is a chapbook style songbook, giving the lyrics of local, now historical songs, with a few bits of other information. It was edited by J. P. Robson and published by P. France & Co. in 1850.

Details
 Songs of the Bards of the Tyne  (full title – “France's Songs of the Bards of the Tyne; A choice selection of original songs, chiefly in the Newcastle Dialect. With a glossary of 800 words. Edited by J. P. Robson, Published by P France & Co., No 8 Side, Newcastle upon Tyne – 1849) is a Chapbook style book of Geordie folk songs consisting of approximately 270 song lyrics on over 560 pages, published in 1850.

It is, as the title suggests, a collection of songs which would have been popular, or topical, at the date of publication. There is very little in the way of biographies of any of the writers or histories of the events.

Contents

Notes
A-M2  –  according to George Allan's Tyneside Songs and Readings of 1891, the writer is James Morrison<br/ >
A-N1  –  according to George Allan's Tyneside Songs and Readings of 1891, the writer is Robert Nunn<br/ >
A-S4  –  according to George Allan's Tyneside Songs and Readings of 1891, the writer is William Stephenson (junior)<br/ >
Br-S6  –  according to Brockie's “The Shields Garland", the writer is John Stobbs<br/ >
F-G1  –  according to Fordyce's Tyne Songster of 1840, the writer is John Gibson<br/ >
F-O1  –  according to Fordyce's Tyne Songster of 1840, the writer is Oliver<br/ >
Fr-Tune2 – according to France's Songs of the Bards of the Tyne – 1850, the tune is "Miss Bailey's Ghost"<br/ >
Fr-Tune3 – according to George Allan's Tyneside Songs and Readings of 1891, the tune is "Derry Down"<br/ >
R-C1  –  according to Ross' Songs of the Tyne of 1846, the writer is Edward Corvan

See also 
Geordie dialect words<br/ >
P. France & Co.

References

External links
 Songs of the Bards of the Tyne

Songs related to Newcastle upon Tyne
Chapbooks